Sir Charles Dance was an English pioneer of motoring in the first third of the 19th century. An enthusiastic motorist, he did a great deal to encourage engineers who were engaged in the invention and development of steam road vehicles.

He was financially interested in several of the companies which were organized to run steam coaches over the common roads. He was the backer of Goldsworthy Gurney, and was also engaged in building for himself. His most famous car was a coach that ran every day from the Strand, London, to Brighton. This was an engine mounted on four wheels with a tall rectangular funnel that narrowed towards the top. Above the engine were seats for six or seven persons besides the driver. On the roof there were places for four passengers, and on a board behind stood the footman. The carriage was one of the spectacular sights of London at that time and great crowds gathered in the Strand every day to witness its departure.

Dance ran Gurney's coaches on the road between Cheltenham and Gloucester until public opposition compelled his withdrawal, but after that he was a joint patentee with Joshua Field of an improved boiler. This was applied to the road carriage above mentioned and the first trips were made in September 1833, with a drag and omnibus attached, a speed of  being attained. At the middle of October the steam drag and omnibus were put on the road between Wellington Street, Waterloo Bridge and Greenwich, where it continued to run for a fortnight, with a view of showing the public in London what could be done in this direction. The proprietor had no intention of making it a permanent mode of conveyance, and therefore kept the company as select as he could by charging half a crown for tickets each way.

See also 
 History of steam road vehicles

References

Original article taken from  Automobile Biographies, by Lyman Horace Weeks, The Monograph Press 1904

People of the Industrial Revolution
Steam road vehicles
Year of birth missing
Year of death missing